Fridtjof Nansen (1861–1930) was a Norwegian polar explorer, scientist, diplomat, humanitarian, and Nobel laureate.

Nansen may also refer to:

People
 Nansen (surname)

Ships 

 Fridtjof Nansen-class frigate, the main surface combatant units of the Royal Norwegian Navy
 HNoMS Fridtjof Nansen (1930), the first ship in the Norwegian armed forces to be built specially to perform coast guard and fishery protection duties in the Arctic
 HNoMS Fridtjof Nansen (F310), a 2004 frigate of the Royal Norwegian Navy

Places
Cape Nansen, headland in the Greenland Sea, east Greenland
Mount Nansen (Antarctica)
Mount Fridtjof Nansen, Antarctica
Mount Nansen (Yukon) in Yukon, Canada
Nansen Island (disambiguation)
Nansen Land, Greenland
Nansen (lunar crater)
Nansen (Martian crater)
Nansen Sound, a strait in Nunavut, Canada, between Ellesmere Island and Axel Heiberg Island
Fridtjof Nansen Peninsula, SE Greenland

Organisations 
 Nansen International Office for Refugees, an organization of the League of Nations in charge of refugees from war areas from 1930 to 1939
 Nansen Institute, an independent research foundation in Norway
 Nansenhjelpen,  also known as Nansen Relief in English,  a humanitarian organization to provide safe haven and assistance in Norway for Jewish refugees from areas in Europe under Nazi control

Other 
 The Nansen Refugee Award
 Nansen (biography), a 1940 children's biography of the explorer by Anna Gertrude Hall
 Nansen (cat), ship's cat on Belgica during the Belgian Antarctic Expedition in 1897–98
 Nansen passport, internationally recognized identity cards first issued by the League of Nations to stateless refugees
 Nansen bottle, an oceanographic sampling device

Danish-language surnames
Norwegian-language surnames